Chino Roces Avenue, formerly known as (and still commonly referred to as) Pasong Tamo, is a prominent north–south road in the cities of Makati and Taguig, Metro Manila, Philippines It runs for  from Olympia and Tejeros to Fort Bonifacio. The avenue is named after Joaquin "Chino" Roces, journalist, founder of The Manila Times and Associated Broadcasting Company (now TV5), and an opposition figure during the Marcos administration. The fact that the avenue is the location of various media establishments influenced the renaming.

The northern end of Chino Roces Avenue is at the intersection with Jose P. Rizal Avenue. It heads southwesterly across the residential and commercial barangays of Olympia, Tejeros, Santa Cruz, and La Paz. After the intersection with Yakal Street in San Antonio, the avenue bends to the south, becoming more commercial as it approaches Gil Puyat Avenue. The road continues southwards through the western limits of the Makati CBD, bending slightly southwesterly between Dela Rosa and Don Bosco Streets. The avenue then becomes mixed commercial and industrial as it continues on a straight route to EDSA.

South of EDSA via a narrow channel under the Magallanes Interchange, as its extension, it serves as a frontage road to South Luzon Expressway. It is lined with light industries and car dealerships on both sides, as well as a few factory outlets, in an area also known as Mantrade or Kayamanan-C. The road ends at Lawton Avenue within Fort Bonifacio in Taguig, near Sales Interchange. Chino Roces has a short extension north of J. P. Rizal Avenue into Barangay Carmona as A. P. Reyes Avenue. The part of Chino Roces from Rufino Street to Arnaiz Avenue is home to several Japanese restaurants and shops, earning it the nickname "Little Tokyo".

The avenue originated as a short street in what was historically known as Malolos Subdivision, a residential subdivision in Tejeros and Olympia. As suggested by surrounding streets in such area named similar to places that played significant roles during the Philippine Revolution (e.g. Malolos, Barasoain, Novaliches, Binakod, Zapote), Pasong Tamo may be named after a barrio in Caloocan (now a barangay in the present-day Quezon City) where the Battle of Pasong Tamo occurred. Its name also comes from an indigenous plant called tamo that once grew there abundantly. It was then extended towards Ocampo Street in the 1940s and later towards southern Makati circa 1950s, making it a major road.

Landmarks

 Laureano Di Trevi by Vista Residences
 Avida Towers San Lorenzo
 Alphaland Southgate Mall and Tower
 Alegria Building
 Cityland Pasong Tamo Tower
 CW Home Depot
 Directories Philippines Corporation (publisher of the Philippine Yellow Pages)
 Don Bosco Technical Institute, Makati
 DPI XL Studios
 Ecoplaza Building
 Eurotel Makati
 Exportbank Plaza
 Green Sun
 Kingswood Towers
 Little Tokyo
 Laureano De Trevi Towers
 Leelin Building
 Makati Hope Christian School
 Makati Central Square (formerly Makati Cinema Square)
 Mantrade
 Mazda Makati
 Molave Building
 National Nutrition Council Nutrition Building
 Oriental Garden Condominium
 Philippine Daily Inquirer Building
 San Lorenzo Place
 Shopwise Makati
 The Oriental Place
 SM Savemore Pasong Tamo
 The Beacon – Roces Tower
 WalterMart Makati
 Wilcon Depot IT Hub

References

External links

Streets in Metro Manila
Makati
Taguig
Makati Central Business District